There are at least 19 named lakes and reservoirs in Liberty County, Montana.

Lakes
 Bingham Lake, el. 
 Chicago Lake, el. 
 Lees Lake, el.

Reservoirs
 Blair Reservoir, el. 
 Bourne and Hamilton Reservoir, el. 
 Bourpe and Hamilton Reservoir, el. 
 Brown Reservoir, el. 
 Browns Reservoir, el. 
 Gagnon Reservoir, el. 
 Great Northern Reservoir, el. 
 Hollandsworth Reservoir, el. 
 Lake Elwell, el. 
 Potts Reservoir, el. 
 Pugsley Reservoir, el. 
 Romain Reservoir, el. 
 Tempel Reservoir, el. 
 Turner Reservoir, el. 
 Vaver Reservoir, el. 
 Walden Reservoir, el.

See also
 List of lakes in Montana

Notes

Bodies of water of Liberty County, Montana
Liberty